Mike Bryan and Jack Sock defeated Pierre-Hugues Herbert and Nicolas Mahut in the final, 5–7, 6–1, [13–11] to win the doubles tennis title at the 2018 ATP Finals. It was Bryan's fifth Tour Finals title, and his first with a partner other than his brother Bob Bryan.

Henri Kontinen and John Peers were the two-time reigning champions, but they only qualified for the first alternate spot. Kontinen and Peers replaced Nikola Mektić and Alexander Peya for the last match in the round-robin competition, but did not progress to the knockout stage.

Seeds

Alternates

Draw

Finals

Group Knowles/Nestor

Group Llodra/Santoro

Standings are determined by: 1. number of wins; 2. number of matches; 3. in two-player ties, head-to-head records; 4. in three-player ties, percentage of sets won, then percentage of games won, then ATP rankings.

References

External links 
Official website
Doubles main draw

Doubles